Yana Qaqa (Quechua yana black, qaqa rock, "black rock", also spelled Yana Ccacca, Yana Kaka, Yana Khakha, Yanacaca, Yanacaja, Yanaccacca, Yanajaja, Yanakaka) may refer to:

 Yana Qaqa (Chayanta), a mountain in the Chayanta Province, Potosí Department, Bolivia
 Yana Qaqa (Chuquisaca), a mountain in the Chuquisaca Department, Bolivia
 Yana Qaqa (Cochabamba), a mountain in the Cochabamba Department, Bolivia
 Yana Qaqa (Nor Chichas), a mountain in the Nor Chichas Province, Potosí Department, Bolivia
 Yana Qaqa (Potosí), a mountain in the Tomás Frías Province, Potosí Department, Bolivia